Tapinanthus letouzeyi is a species of plant in the family Loranthaceae. It is endemic to Cameroon.  Its natural habitat is subtropical or tropical dry forests. It is threatened by habitat loss.

References

Endemic flora of Cameroon
letouzeyi
Vulnerable plants
Taxonomy articles created by Polbot